Duška Vučinić-Lučić is a Serbian television journalist, presenter, and director who is currently head of Press and Public Relations at RTS.

Since 2003 she has been the head of the Serbian delegation for the Eurovision Song Contest and has provided national television commentary for the event since the 2003 contest. For the 2008 contest she served as executive producer for the contest, and since the 2009 contest she has been providing the television commentary for the semi Serbia participated in and the final.

References

Living people
Serbian television presenters
Serbian women television presenters
Serbian journalists
Serbian women journalists
Serbian television directors
Serbia in the Eurovision Song Contest
Year of birth missing (living people)
Women television directors